Fernando Morais (born 27 January 1966) is an Angolan footballer. He played in ten matches for the Angola national football team in 1998 and 1999. He was also named in Angola's squad for the 1998 African Cup of Nations tournament.

References

External links
 

1966 births
Living people
Angolan footballers
Angola international footballers
1998 African Cup of Nations players
Place of birth missing (living people)
Association footballers not categorized by position